Grøstad is a surname. Notable people with the surname include:

Einar Grøstad (1902–1983), Norwegian jurist and civil servant
Paul Grøstad (1933–2011), Norwegian businessman
Terje Grøstad (1925–2011), Norwegian painter and illustrator

Surnames of Norwegian origin